Reshevsky, Rzeszewski or Rejewski (Polish: [rɛˈjɛfskʲi]) is a Polish masculine surname. Its feminine counterpart is Reshevska, Rzeszewska or Rejewska. The surname may refer to
Lenny Rzeszewski (1923–2013), American basketball player
Marian Rejewski (1905–1980), Polish mathematician and cryptologist
 Samuel Reshevsky (1911–1992), Polish-born American chess player

Polish-language surnames